The 1909 Buchtel football team represented Buchtel College in the 1909 college football season. The team was led by first-year head coach Clarence Weed, in his only season. Buchtel was outscored by their opponents by a total of 54–69.

Schedule

References

Buchtel
Akron Zips football seasons
Buchtel football